Coalition for Effective Public Safety (CEPS) is a California-based criminal justice reform coalition of approximately 40 organizations united behind specific principles aimed at increasing public safety in California while curtailing the reliance upon costly, ineffective practices such as mass incarceration. 

CEPS works through advocacy, organizing and public education to reduce prison spending by: 
a. eliminating barriers to successful re-entry for those coming home from prison; 
b. reducing recidivism through effective educational and vocational programming and comprehensive treatment; 
c. opposing new prison construction in California; 
d. utilizing parole reform, sentencing reform and re-investment in communities to reduce the number of people in prison.

Member organizations
CEPS member organizations include:

 
 A New Way of Life
 Action Committee for Women in Prison
 All of Us or None
 American Civil Liberties Union
 American Friends' Service Committee
 A New PATH
 Behind the Walls
 Books Not Bars
 California Attorneys for Criminal Justice
 California Families Against Mandatory Minimums
 California Prison Moratorium Project
 California State NAACP
 Center for Young Women’s Development
 Center on Juvenile and Criminal Justice
 Centerforce
 Citizens for the Three Strikes Reform
 Critical Resistance
 Drug Policy Alliance
 Ella Baker Center for Human Rights
 ESPINO Coalition
 Families to Amend California‘s Three Strikes
 Friends Committee on Legislation
 Get on the Bus
 Justice Now
 Justice Policy Institute
 Legal Services for Prisoners with Children
 Lutheran Office of Public Policy
 Murder Victims’ Families for Reconciliation, Inc.
 National Action Network- CA Chapter
 PICO California Project
 Progressive Christians Uniting
 SEIU-Local 535
 SEIU-Local 1000
 SEIU-State Council
 Women & Criminal Justice
 Youth Against Youth Incarceration
 Youth in Focus
 Youth Justice Coalition/ Free LA!

See also 
 Department of Public Safety

References 
 Drug Policy Alliance Reports in February 2006 CEPS action Retrieved February 12, 2007
 Aug. 2006, Floor Alert, CEPS Opposes New Legislation to Build More Prisons Retrieved February 12, 2007
 SEIU Local 1000 supports CEPS in 2004 Retrieved February 12, 2007
 Common Counsel Foundation- 2006 Grantees Retrieved February 12, 2007
 CA Assembly Bill 505 (2005) - Bill Analysis Retrieved February 12, 2007
 Oakland Tribune, April 11, 2005, "Lawmaker tackles parole reform" Retrieved February 12, 2007
 San Diego Union-Tribune, April 27, 2006, "The high cost of prison overcrowding" Retrieved February 12, 2007

Criminal justice reform in the United States
Organizations based in California